Handball Cercle Nimes is a French women's handball club from Nimes playing in the French Championship. It was established in 1971.

Nimes' is one of the leading teams in the Challenge Cup, having won the competition in 2001 and 2009. Its major success in other EHF competitions to date was reaching the 2012 EHF Cup quarterfinals. It has reached the national cup's final in 1999, 2003 and 2011 and the League Cup's final in 2010, losing to ASPTT Metz, ES Besançon and Toulon Handball.

Titles
 Challenge Cup
 2001, 2009

References

French handball clubs
Sport in Nîmes